Mioawateria ektonos is a species of sea snail, a marine gastropod mollusk in the family Raphitomidae.

Description
The length of the shell attains 12 mm.

Distribution
This marine species occurs off Papua New Guinea and the Solomon Islands

References

 Morassi, M. & Bonfitto, A. (2010) New raphitomine gastropods (Gastropoda: Conidae: Raphitominae) from the South-West Pacific. Zootaxa, 2526:54-68

External links

ektonos
Gastropods described in 2010